The College of St. Scholastica (CSS) is a private Benedictine college in Duluth, Minnesota. Founded in 1912 by a group of pioneering Benedictine Sisters, today St. Scholastica educates almost 4,000 students annually and has graduated more than 29,000 alumni. The college offers a liberal arts education and is located on 186 wooded acres overlooking Lake Superior.

History

The College of St. Scholastica owes its existence to the combining of two forces: Benedictine missionaries and the settlement of Duluth. In 1892, Mother Scholastica Kerst and 28 sisters arrived from St. Joseph, Minnesota, to spearhead the establishment of a Benedictine motherhouse and an academy in Duluth.

The school and convent were located at Munger Terrace before growth required a move to a new facility at Third Avenue East and Third Street. Named Sacred Heart Institute, the high school continued to grow rapidly. Duluth's rapid expansion led to a third move in 1909 to its present location.

Mother Scholastica's vision for the college can be summed up in this quote attributed to her: "My dream is that someday there will rise upon these grounds fine buildings like the great Benedictine abbeys. They will be built of stone: within their walls higher education will flourish."

The school expanded its course offerings in 1912 to include a junior college and changed its name to The College of St. Scholastica. The college started with only six students and 52 courses offered in eight departments in its first year. Academic leadership and research were stressed early as an integral part of the college's commitment to Benedictine values.

In 1924, the college became a four-year liberal arts institute with an enrollment of 68. The school's first baccalaureate degrees were granted in 1926. In 1969, it became a fully coeducational institution.

As a Benedictine institution, the college is affiliated with the Order of Saint Benedict. Its endowment stands at more than $89.9 million.

Presidents
Mother Agnes Somers, 1924–1942
Mother Athanasius Braegeleman, 1942–1954
Mother Martina Hughes, 1954–1958
Sister Joselyn Baldeschweiler, 1958–1960
Sister Ann Edward Scanlon, 1960–1967
Sister Mary Richard Boo, 1967–1971
The Rev. F. X. Shea, 1971–1974
Sister Joan Braun, 1974–1975
Bruce Stender, 1975–1981
Daniel Pilon, 1981–1998
Larry Goodwin, 1998–2016
Dr. Colette McCarrick Geary, 2016–2019
Dr. Barbara McDonald, 2019–present

Symbols
The shield of the college shows a lily, blooming with three flowers symbolizing the three Persons of the Blessed Trinity. The base of the lily is enclosed by a crescent, the heraldic symbol of the Virgin Mary, and the purity of Christian teaching. Symbolizing the college, a book occupies the center of the field, bearing the motto of St. Scholastica. It is adapted from the second part of the Book of Proverbs line "Her ways are ways of beauty, and all her paths are peace," and reads in Latin, "."

Campuses 
In addition to the main campus in Duluth, St. Scholastica has sites in St. Cloud, St. Paul and embedded sites in Brainerd, Austin, Cloquet, Inver Grove Heights, Rochester and a virtual campus.

The Duluth campus is home to most undergraduate students. The 186-acre campus is set on a hill overlooking Lake Superior. Campus buildings include: Tower Hall, the Science Center, Our Lady Queen of Peace Chapel, Burns Wellness Commons, the 500-seat Mitchell Auditorium, the College Library, the St. Scholastica Theatre, Somers Residence Hall, and nine apartment complexes. A new Health Science Center housing graduate health science programs opened for classes in 2016. The building is at 940 Woodland Ave. in the BlueStone development, about a mile from the main campus.

Library
The college library provides over 350,000 print and electronic books, full-text journal databases, interlibrary loan services, laptops, wireless Internet access, group study rooms, and quiet study space. It is located on the upper floors of the Romanesque-styled Our Lady Queen of Peace Chapel building. Along with the library, the college archives preserves the written and visual history of the college, as well as housing special collections such as the papers of James Franklin Lewis.

Tower Hall

Tower Hall is St. Scholastica's castle-like central building. Its origins date to a picnic in around 1907, when the Diocese of Duluth's Bishop James McGolrick commented that the top of the hill at the college's current site was a perfect location for a building. According to the historic records of Sister Agnes Somers, McGolrick and a group of students and sisters climbed to the top of the hill and placed a pile of stones, symbolizing the cornerstone of what would eventually become Tower Hall. In 1906, architects Anton Werner Lignell and Frederick German were hired to draw the plans for the school, Villa Sancta Scholastica Academy, and the motherhouse. Mother Scholastica Kerst disapproved of the plans due to potential defects in the building's design, and the two architects were fired from the project in 1908; it was taken over by Franklin Ellerbe. The following year saw the groundbreaking and start of construction for Tower Hall. Its first unit was completed in 1909. That September, 75 students from the Institute of the Sacred Heart were relocated to what was then called Villa St. Scholastica. Tower Hall was completed in 1928, and had two towers, a north to south axis of 375 feet, turrets at each end, recessed fenestration, and Tudor towers flanking the façade.

Sharing the campus are St. Scholastica Monastery, home of the Benedictine Sisters; and the Benedictine Health Center and Westwood Assisted Living Facility, which provide experiences for many of the college's health science and behavioral arts and sciences students.

In September 2012, the college's Centennial year, St. Scholastica opened a 40,000 square-foot addition to its existing 125,000 square-foot Science Center. The addition includes seven laboratories for chemistry and biochemistry, six faculty-undergraduate student research areas, two classrooms for pre-laboratory meetings and general class use, faculty offices, an atrium-style gathering area, a greenhouse, and state-of-the-art environmental and sustainable technologies throughout, including for storage of chemicals and treatment of hazardous waste.

Academics 
The college awards bachelor's, master's degrees, and doctoral degrees, and has a student to faculty ratio of 14:1. Undergraduate majors include liberal arts and science programs as well as pre-professional programs. Graduate degrees are offered in health professions, education, technology, business, and social work.

All first-year students take part in a program called Dignitas (Dignity). The program's goals are that participants will accept and value the challenges and responsibilities involved in being a first-year college student, reflect on issues from various perspectives, and make connections with the larger community. A combination of course material, co-curricular activities, and common experiences is intended to prepare students for learning both during and after college.

Student life

Campus housing 
St. Scholastica houses students living on campus in nine buildings. They are:

 Cedar Hall Apartments – Opened in 2003. 100 residents. Total square footage /unit.
 Kerst Hall – Opened in 2005. 160 students. Total square footage /unit.
 Pine, Maple, Willow and Birch Apartments – Nearly identical. Built in 1973, 1989, 1989, and 1990 respectively. 43 residents each. Total square footage /unit.
 Scanlon Hall – Opened in 2005. 128 residents. Total square footage /unit.
 Somers Hall – Built in 1964. Primarily first-year housing. Population 314 students. Building also houses the Greenview Dining Room, Somers Main Lounge, Office of Residential Life, Health Services, Campus Operator, and a penthouse lounge/study area. Dorms measure 9'3" x 17'4" (double room) and 6'5" x 17'4" (single-room).
 Somers Suites – Built in 1993. Connected to Somers Hall. Four floors. (three-bedroom).

Student Government Association 
The College of St. Scholastica Student Government Association (SGA) is responsible for making decisions and advocating for policy that impacts the student body. The SGA has 40 seats, which include 10 each from the freshman, sophomore, junior and senior classes; as well as representative positions for two graduate students, and two transfer or previously studying-abroad students. SGA officers include the President, Executive Vice President, Financial Vice President, Vice President of Diversity and Inclusion, Chief of Staff, Speaker of the Senate, and Communications Director. The Senate also has three standing committees, which include the Internal Affairs Committee, External Affairs Committee, and Student Affairs Committee. Each standing committee has a chair.

Athletics
The College of St. Scholastica fields 22 athletic teams, including 11 women's (basketball, cross country, Nordic skiing, soccer, softball, indoor track & field, outdoor track & field, hockey, tennis, golf, and volleyball) and 11 men's teams (basketball, cross country, Nordic skiing, soccer, baseball, indoor track & field, outdoor track & field, hockey, football, golf, and tennis). The college's athletic teams are called the Saints. All teams, except Nordic skiing, compete in the Minnesota Intercollegiate Athletic Conference, which is part of the NCAA's Division III.

Notable people
Mary Odile Cahoon – Benedictine nun who was among the first women to do research in Antarctica; founded the college's study abroad program in Ireland 
Scott Jurek – class of 1996, American ultramarathon runner
Emily Larson – class of 1995, current mayor of Duluth
Mary Murphy – class of 1961, Minnesota House of Representatives
Don Ness – class of 2014, former mayor of Duluth 
Michael Paymar – class of 1983, Minnesota House of Representatives
Ellen Pence – class of 1991, leading domestic abuse prevention advocate
Patrick J. Schiltz – class of 1981, U. S. District Judge, District of Minnesota
Kathleen Seefeldt – class of 1956, former Chairman of Prince William County, Virginia Board of Supervisors

See also

 List of colleges and universities in Minnesota
 Higher education in Minnesota

References

External links 
 
Official athletics website

 
Benedictine colleges and universities
Education in Duluth, Minnesota
Educational institutions established in 1912
Former women's universities and colleges in the United States
Universities and colleges in St. Louis County, Minnesota
Catholic universities and colleges in Minnesota
Association of Catholic Colleges and Universities
Roman Catholic Diocese of Duluth
1912 establishments in Minnesota